The Lure of Hollywood is a 1931 American Pre-Code comedy film directed by Fatty Arbuckle.

Cast
 Virginia Brooks
 Rita Flynn
 Phyllis Crane
 George Chandler
 Bryant Washburn

See also
 Fatty Arbuckle filmography

External links

1931 films
Films directed by Roscoe Arbuckle
Educational Pictures short films
American black-and-white films
1931 comedy films
1931 short films
American comedy short films
Films with screenplays by Jack Townley
1930s English-language films
1930s American films